Aleksandra Gaworska (born 7 November 1995) is a Polish sprinter competing in the 400 metres and 400 metres hurdles. She won a bronze medal in the 4 × 400 metres relay at the 2017 World Championships.

International competitions

Personal bests
Outdoor
 400 metres – 52.45 (Bydgoszcz 2017)
 400 metres hurdles – 56.87 (Radom 2017)
Indoor
 400 metres – 54.20 (Spała 2017)

References

1995 births
Living people
Polish female sprinters
Polish female hurdlers
World Athletics Championships athletes for Poland
World Athletics Championships medalists
Sportspeople from Bełchatów
Universiade medalists in athletics (track and field)
Universiade gold medalists for Poland
World Athletics Indoor Championships medalists
Medalists at the 2017 Summer Universiade